Ida Marie Baad Nielsen (born 9 July 1992) is a Danish sailor. She competed in the 49er FX event at the 2020 Summer Olympics.

References

External links
 
 
 Ida Marie Baad Nielsen and Marie Thusgaard at the Danish Sailing Association

1992 births
Living people
Danish female sailors (sport)
Olympic sailors of Denmark
Sailors at the 2020 Summer Olympics – 49er FX
Place of birth missing (living people)